Erotic Nights of the Living Dead is a 1980 Italian erotic horror film filmed in and around Santo Domingo and written and directed by Joe D'Amato. It has received mixed to negative reviews.

Synopsis

On his second visit to the Dominican Republic, John Wilson, a land developer for a foreign company planning to build a hotel, leases a tropical island from the government, which - unbeknownst to him - carries a voodoo curse. He plans to go there to survey the land. At night, he has sex in his hotel room with two prostitutes, whom he scares away by mentioning the name Cat Island. In the hall, he meets Fiona, a socialite who - as she tells him - has just left her elderly lover and his yacht. He performs cunnilingus on her.

Sea captain Larry O'Hara spends the same night on his skipper, having sex with Liz, the local nightclub owner. Just as they are about to leave, Liz spots a zombie walking in the shallow water of the port, his hand outstretched towards them. O’Hara kills him with a grappling iron. Later in the morgue, the doctor examines the maggot-ridden corpse, which suddenly grabs him, kills him with a gory bite in the neck, and walks away.

The next day, Wilson hires O’Hara to take him and Fiona for the trip to the island. O’Hara tells him about the legend surrounding the island, about zombies led by a cat. At night, in Liz's empty nightclub, Liz gets on stage and dances for O’Hara, uncorking a bottle of champagne with her vagina. In his room with Fiona, Wilson suddenly feels someone's unseen presence. It is Luna's, who sits on the island graveyard and establishes contact with him, scratching her hand until her green blood shows. O'Hara spots a black cat at the nightclub, which hisses and leaves.

The group sails to the island the next day, where they are greeted by Luna and a shaman. They are warned to leave as the island is the reported home to zombies of dead natives. But Luna, who might be a ghost, takes a liking to Larry.

Cast
 Laura Gemser as Luna
 George Eastman as Larry O'Hara
 Dirce Funari as Fiona
 Mark Shannon as John Wilson
 Lucía Ramírez as Liz (uncredited)

Production
Erotic Nights of the Living Dead was filmed at the same time as Porno Holocaust in Santo Domingo with the same cast. Both films involve a group of foreigners who find an island, have sex, and then are killed off one by one.

Release

Theatrical
Erotic Nights of the Living Dead was released in 1980 and was not a large success. As D'Amato remarked in an interview, "Le notti erotiche dei morti viventi was a total fiasco. I had endeavored to mingle my two favorite genres, tending more toward the erotic side in this case, but the film was rejected by the public."

Home media
On 15 June 2018, the film was released on blu-ray by Code Red DVD in its English dubbed hardcore version.

Reception
In 2005, Louis Paul wrote in a chapter devoted to D'Amato that the film "is pure cinema horror trash, but watchable nonetheless. In the history of the Italian horror film there is no other feature film quite like it."

In 2011, Danny Shipka, author of Perverse Titillation: The Exploitation Cinema of Italy, Spain and France, 1960-1980 gave both Porno Holocaust and Erotic Nights of the Living Dead a negative review, criticising the acting, gore effects and sex scenes, and stated that the merging of "hard-core sex and extreme violence is disturbing" The book Zombie Movies: The Ultimate Guide describes the film as "one of the worst if not the worst Italian zombie movie ever made".

References

Sources
 Kay, Glenn. Zombie Movies:The Ultimate Guide. Chicago Review Press, 2008. .
 Paul, Louis.Italian Horror Film Directors. McFarland, 2005. 
 Shipka, Danny. Perverse Titillation: The Exploitation Cinema of Italy, Spain and France, 1960-1980. McFarland, 2011. .

External links
 
 Erotic Nights of the Living Dead at Variety Distribution

Films directed by Joe D'Amato
1980 horror films
1980 films
Italian sexploitation films
Italian erotic horror films
Italian pornographic films
Italian splatter films
1980s pornographic films
Pornographic zombie films
Films about Voodoo
Films set on islands
Films set in the Dominican Republic
Films shot in the Dominican Republic
Films scored by Marcello Giombini
Pornographic parody films of horror films
1980s Italian-language films
1980s Italian films